Mathias Hauzeur (1589 at Verviers – 12 November 1676 at Liège) was a Belgian Franciscan theologian.

Life

He was for many years professor of theology. He was a prolific writer and left behind twenty works, while, as a keen controversialist, he attained great celebrity in consequence of his disputation with the Calvinist preacher Gabriel Hotton, which continued from 19 to 22 April 1633, and, was brought by Hauzeur to such a conclusion that the Catholics throughout the vicinity lit bonfires to celebrate his triumph.

Works

He describes this controversy in his "Accusation et conviction du Sieur Hotton" (Liège, 1633), issued also in Latin under the title "Conferentia publica inter M. Hauzeur et G. Hotton" (Liège, 1633). Other important works of Hauzeur are:

"Exorcismes catholiques du maling esprit hérétique etc." (Liège, 1634), directed against the same opponent; 
"Equulcus ecclesiasticus, aculeatus exorcismis XXIII etc." (Liège, 1635), against the Calvinist Samuel des Maretz; 
"Praejudicia augustissima D. Augustini pro verâ Christi Ecclesiâ" (Liège, 1634) of which he published a Synopsis in French.

He then combined the last-named three works in including in the new volume the "Livre de ce grand Docteur S. Augustine du soing qu'il faut porter pour les morts" (Liège, 1636). He also issued a Flemish translation of Augustin's "De utilitate credendi" (Liège, 1636), but his writings against Jansenism remained unpublished.

His major works were, "Anatomia totius Augustissimae Doctrinae S. Augustini, secundum litteram ... et spiritum" (2 vols., Augustae Eburonum 1643-45), and "Collatio Totius Theologiae inter Maiores nostros Alexandrum Halensem, S. Bonaventuram, Fr. Joannem Druns Scotum, ad mentem S. Augustini" (2 vols., Liège and Namur, 1652). This work is really a commentary on the second, third, and fourth books of the "Sentences". Like the majority of Hauzeur's works, it was issued from the private press of Franciscans. In reply to Boverius's "Annales Ord. Min. Capucc". Hauzeur wrote the "Apologia Analogica pro vero ordine et successore S. Francisci" (Aug. Eburorum, 1650, and 1653).

References
Sbaralea, Supplementum ad Scriptores Ord. Min. (Rome, 1806), 531; 
Dirks, Histoire litteraire et bibliographique des Freres Mineurs de l'Observance en Belgique (Antwerp, 1885), 246-56.

External links

Catholic Encyclopedia article

1589 births
1676 deaths
Belgian Franciscans
Roman Catholic theologians of the Spanish Netherlands